Liverpool Township may refer to the following townships in the United States:

 Liverpool Township, Fulton County, Illinois
 Liverpool Township, Columbiana County, Ohio
 Liverpool Township, Medina County, Ohio
 Liverpool Township, Perry County, Pennsylvania